Soulsinger: The Revival is a re-release of the debut album by the American singer-songwriter Ledisi, released independently as Soulsinger in 2000 by Ledisi's label, LeSun Records. The album was later distributed by Tommy Boy Records. It was nominated for a Bammie, for best R&B album.

Production
Soulsinger: The Revival was written and produced by Ledisi and Sundra Manning.

Critical reception
AllMusic wrote that "cool jazzy flavors (including the catchy 'I Wantcha Babe') and sweet floaters ('Take Time' and 'In My Life') balance the more dramatic cuts and provide a comfortable plateau for Ledisi's fluid alto." The San Francisco Chronicle wrote: "One moment sad and sweet, loud and fierce the next, [Ledisi's] music is part down-home lovin' and good advice."

Track listing
"Get Outta My Kitchen" (Ledisi Young, Sundra Manning) – 3:51
"Stop Livin' in Ya Head" (Young, Manning) – 4:42
"Take Time" (Young, Manning, Nelson Braxton) – 5:11
"You Are My Friend" (Young, Manning) – 4:12
"Coffee" (Young, Manning) – 5:32
"Good Lovin'" (Young, Manning) – 3:41
"Hotel" (Young, Manning) – 3:43
"Dreaming Interlude" (Young, Manning) – 1:43
"Free Again" (Young, Manning, LeGerald Normand) – 4:49
"Soulsinger" (Young, Manning) – 3:51
"My Prayers" (Young, Manning) – 4:38
"In My Life" (Young, Manning) – 4:51
"Groove On" (Young, Manning, Paisley) – 5:34
"I Want'cha Babe" (Young, Manning) – 4:32
"I Want'cha Babe Interlude" (Young, Manning) – 1:11
"Papa Loved to Love Me" (Young, Manning) – 3:45
"Soulsinger" (Live) (Young, Manning) – 4:27
"Hold on to Love" (Young, Manning, Me'Shell Ndegéocello) – 4:37
"Snoring" – 0:29

References

2000 debut albums
Ledisi albums
Easy listening albums
Tommy Boy Records albums